Arborio rice is an Italian short-grain rice. It is named after the town of Arborio, in the Po Valley, which is situated in the region of Piedmont in Italy. When cooked, the rounded grains are firm, creamy and chewy compared to other varieties of rice, due to their higher amylopectin starch content. It has a starchy taste and blends well with other flavours. Arborio rice is often used to make risotto; other suitable varieties include Carnaroli, Maratelli, Baldo,  and Vialone Nano. Arborio rice is also usually used for rice pudding.

Arborio is a cultivar of the Japonica group of varieties of Oryza sativa.

See also
 Italian cuisine
 Bomba rice

References

Italian cuisine
Japonica rice